Kim Chan-mi (born December 15, 1989) is a South Korean sport shooter. She won a silver medal in the women's air rifle at the 2007 Asian Shooting Championships, with a score of 501.1 points, earning a spot on the South Korean team for the Olympics.

Kim represented South Korea at the 2008 Summer Olympics in Beijing, where she competed in the women's 10 m air rifle, along with her teammate Kim Yeo-oul. She finished only in tenth place by one point behind Slovakia's Daniela Pešková from the final attempt, for a total score of 396 targets.

References

External links
NBC 2008 Olympics profile

South Korean female sport shooters
Living people
Olympic shooters of South Korea
Shooters at the 2008 Summer Olympics
1989 births